The Aurora XV-24 LightningStrike is an experimental unmanned aerial vehicle created by Aurora Flight Sciences and partners Rolls-Royce and Honeywell. It was developed for the Vertical Take-Off and Landing Experimental Aircraft program.

Development
On 3 March 2016, DARPA awarded Aurora Flight Sciences $89.4 million to build and demonstrate their LightningStrike concept, beating out the other three competitors.
Phase II of the VTOL X-Plane project will fabricate two air vehicles before flight testing, planned by September 2018.
A 20 percent-scale demonstrator, weighing 325 lb (147 kg) using wings and canards made of carbon composites and 3D-printed plastics, was flown on 29 March 2016. The full-scale aircraft will be designated the XV-24A.

In April 2018, after the subscale demonstrator achieved the VTOL X-Plane major objectives, Darpa cancelled the project before flight testing due to no successor to inherit the program and growing commercial interest, as electric distributed propulsion is used in Aurora’s eVTOL aircraft developed with Uber Elevate.

Design 
The LightningStrike is a tilting-wing design powered by one Rolls-Royce AE1107C turboshaft engine, the same type used on the V-22 Osprey, that generates electric power via three Honeywell generators to run 24 distributed ducted fans, three each in the forward canards and 18 across the main wing. Rather than using conventional engines like all the other entrants, the aircraft relies on "distributed electric propulsion" where the three generators that produce three megawatts (4,023 horsepower) of electricity, as much as a commercial wind turbine, power individual motors that drive the fans; each wing fan uses a 100 kW motor, and each canard fan a 70 kW motor.

See also
 Lilium Jet
 List of unmanned aerial vehicles
 List of active United States military aircraft

References

Unmanned aerial vehicles of the United States
Hybrid electric aircraft